John Robert Perrigan (March 25, 1892 – August 1, 1966) was an American Negro league second baseman in the 1920s.

A native of Chester, Pennsylvania, Perrigan played for the Hilldale Club in 1921. In 11 recorded games, he posted five hits in 32 plate appearances. Perrigan died in his hometown of Chester in 1966 at age 74.

References

External links
Baseball statistics and player information from Baseball-Reference Black Baseball Stats and Seamheads

1892 births
1966 deaths
Hilldale Club players
Baseball second basemen
Baseball players from Pennsylvania
Sportspeople from Chester, Pennsylvania
20th-century African-American sportspeople